The Tissino is a small watercourse of eastern Umbria in Italy.

The Tissino is not to be confused with the Tescino, about a dozen km away, that flows into the Nera at Terni; nor with the Ticino, a large river of northern Italy.

Rivers of Umbria
Rivers of Italy